Senator Baca may refer to:

Gregory A. Baca (fl. 2010s), New Mexico State Senate
Joe Baca (born 1947), California State Senate
Polly Baca (born 1941), Colorado State Senate